Ted Knight (born Tadeusz Wladyslaw Konopka; December 7, 1923August 26, 1986) was an American actor well known for playing the comedic roles of Ted Baxter in The Mary Tyler Moore Show, Henry Rush in Too Close for Comfort, and Judge Elihu Smails in Caddyshack.

Early life 
Knight was born in the Terryville section of Plymouth in Litchfield County, Connecticut, to Polish-American parents, Sophia (Kavaleski) and Charles Walter Konopka, a bartender. Knight dropped out of high school to enlist in the United States Army in World War II along with his best childhood friend Bernard P. Dzielinski (also from Terryville). He was a member of A Company, 296th Combat Engineer Battalion, earning five battle stars while serving in the European Theatre.

Career

Early roles
During the postwar years, Knight studied acting in Hartford, Connecticut. He became proficient with puppets and ventriloquism, which led to steady work as a television children’s show host at WJAR-TV in Providence, Rhode Island, from 1950 to 1955. In 1955, he left Providence for Albany, New York, where he landed a job at station WROW-TV (now WTEN), hosting The Early Show, featuring MGM movies; and a kids' variety show, playing a "Gabby Hayes" type character named "Windy Knight". He was also a radio announcer for sister station WROW radio and briefly for WFNS in Burlington NC. He left the station in 1957 after receiving advice from station manager (and future Capital Cities Chairman) Thomas Murphy that he should take his talents to Hollywood.

Knight spent most of the 1950s and 1960s creating commercial voice-overs and playing minor television and movie roles. He had a small part playing a police officer seen guarding the room where Norman Bates, now in custody, sat wrapped in a blanket at the end of Alfred Hitchcock's Psycho (1960). He played Phil Buckley on the ABC soap opera The Young Marrieds in the early 1960s. He also made guest appearances in numerous series, including How to Marry a Millionaire, Highway Patrol, Lassie, The Donna Reed Show, Peter Gunn, The Twilight Zone (in the episode "The Lonely"), Bourbon Street Beat, Death Valley Days, The Man and the Challenge, Alfred Hitchcock Presents, Mr. Lucky, One Step Beyond, Pete and Gladys, Surfside 6, Sea Hunt, The Asphalt Jungle, Dr. Kildare, General Electric Theatre, Manhunt, Cain's Hundred, The New Loretta Young Show, The Eleventh Hour, The Untouchables, Sam Benedict, The Virginian, Arrest and Trial, Ripcord, The Lieutenant, The Outer Limits (in the episode "The Invisible Enemy"), McHale's Navy, Gunsmoke (as a dishonest lawyer in the 1959 S4E36 episode “Print Asper”), Kraft Suspense Theatre, Run for Your Life, 12 O'Clock High, Bonanza, Gomer Pyle, U.S.M.C., Combat!, T.H.E. Cat,  The Fugitive, The F.B.I., Get Smart, The Invaders, Judd, for the Defense, Garrison's Gorillas, The Wild Wild West, The Outsider, and The Immortal.

Knight's speaking voice also brought him work as a voice artist for various animated series produced by Filmation and Hanna-Barbera, including  The Superman/Aquaman Hour of Adventure, The Batman/Superman Hour, Journey to the Center of the Earth, Fantastic Voyage, The New Scooby-Doo Movies, Super Friends, and Lassie's Rescue Rangers.

The Mary Tyler Moore Show 
His role as the vain and untalented WJM newscaster Ted Baxter on The Mary Tyler Moore Show brought Knight widespread recognition and his greatest success. He received six Emmy Award nominations for the role, winning the Emmy for "Outstanding Performance by an Actor in a Supporting Role in Comedy" in 1973 and 1976.

Post-MTM appearances 
In 1975, Knight recorded an album of mostly novelty songs, Hi Guys, on the Ranwood label (which was co-founded by Lawrence Welk and re-released many of his earlier albums). The title track, in which Knight tries to get out of various embarrassing situations by using his signature "Hi, guys!" line, received some play on the Dr. Demento show.

Knight was the special guest star on the first episode of The Bobby Vinton Show in September 1975. Vinton highlighted Knight's Polish heritage and the two sang a duet of Vinton's hit "My Melody of Love" in Polish. Knight was also featured in a production number based on one of the songs from the Hi Guys album, "I'm in Love with Barbara Walters".

Knight used a variation of the Ted Baxter character for regional commercials. In the Cleveland area during the early to late 1970s, a newsman simply known as "Ted" would provide news of the events at a local shopping center known as Southgate USA, often finishing the 60-second spot with a comedic flair, including wearing a jacket that resembled Baxter's blue "WJM" blazer. The spots were produced by UAB Productions for Southgate USA. UAB Productions was the local production arm of United Artists Broadcasting, which owned WUAB-TV in the Cleveland area at that time. Knight also returned to Albany to film promo spots for his former employer, WTEN's local news show.

After The Mary Tyler Moore Shows run, Knight guest-starred in "Mr. Dennis Steps Out", the October 26, 1977, episode of the situation comedy Busting Loose, as Roger Dennis, the owner of an escort service in New York City. This episode was spun off into its own show, The Ted Knight Show, giving Knight his first starring role. The Ted Knight Show lasted for only six episodes in the spring of 1978.

Knight appeared in a few episodes of The Love Boat, including one episode as a rival cruise captain, Captain Gunner Nordquist, versus Mary Tyler Moore Show co-star Gavin MacLeod's Captain Merrill Stubing. This was broadcast in March 1982 as Season 5, Episodes 24 and 25, of The Love Boat, whose segments were titled "Pride of the Pacific", "The Viking's Son", "Separate Vacations", "The Experiment", and "Getting to Know You".

Knight's final big-screen role was in the 1980 golf comedy Caddyshack, where he played Judge Elihu Smails, who is fed up with the shenanigans of Al Czervik (Rodney Dangerfield), a guest at his golf club.

Too Close for Comfort 
Knight was cast in the lead role as the kind, curmudgeonly cartoonist Henry Rush in the series Too Close for Comfort in 1980. During scenes in which Henry draws in his bedroom, Knight used his earlier acquired ventriloquism talents for comical conversations with a hand-puppet version of his comic book's main character "Cosmic Cow". Throughout the run of the series, Knight would wear sweatshirts from colleges and universities, which were often sent to him by students who were fans of the show. ABC cancelled the show after three seasons, but it was revived in first-run syndication in 1984. In 1986, the show became The Ted Knight Show and saw Henry Rush retire from cartooning and become part-owner of a weekly newspaper. A second season was planned until his health became a factor.

Personal life 
In 1948, he married Dorothy Smith, and the couple had three children, Ted Jr., Elyse, and Eric.

In January 1985, Knight was awarded a star on the Hollywood Walk of Fame for his contributions to the television industry. It is located at 6673 Hollywood Boulevard.

Death 
A few months after the end of the Mary Tyler Moore Show in 1977, Knight was diagnosed with colon cancer for which he received treatment. In 1985, the cancer returned and spread to his bladder and gastrointestinal tract.

Knight experienced complications from the surgery and was advised not to resume work on Too Close For Comfort until he recovered. Knight's condition worsened and he died on August 26, 1986, at age 62.

Knight was interred in the Forest Lawn Memorial Park in Glendale, California. His grave marker bears the name Theodore C. Konopka, and the words "Bye Guy", a reference to his Ted Baxter catchphrase "Hi, guys!")

His hometown of Terryville, Connecticut, dedicated a bridge on Canal Street over the Pequabuck River in his memory. There is a bronze plaque bearing his likeness on the bridge.

Filmography

References

External links 

 
 

 Interview with Lydia Cornell by Michael Sutton
 Interview with Lydia Cornell on the podcast The Future and You (anecdotes about Ted Knight and Too Close For Comfort)
 Link to the home page of the Ted Knight Memorial 'Gof' Tournament
 

1923 births
1986 deaths
American people of Polish descent
20th-century American male actors
American male film actors
American male soap opera actors
American male television actors
American male voice actors
Burials at Forest Lawn Memorial Park (Glendale)
Deaths from cancer in California
Deaths from colorectal cancer
Male actors from Connecticut
Male actors from Los Angeles
Military personnel from Connecticut
Outstanding Performance by a Supporting Actor in a Comedy Series Primetime Emmy Award winners
People from Terryville, Connecticut
United States Army personnel of World War II
United States Army soldiers